Bound for Cairo (Spanish: Rumbo al Cairo) is a 1935 Spanish musical comedy film directed by Benito Perojo and starring Miguel Ligero and María del Carmen Merino. The film was produced by the largest Spanish company Cifesa, and was patterned after successful Hollywood films of the same kind. It has been described as one of the most accomplished Spanish films of the period. The journey of the title ends happily in Majorca, some way short of the intended destination of Cairo.

Cast
 Miguel Ligero as Quique  
 Ricardo Núñez as Jaime Noriega 
 María del Carmen Merino as Celia  
 Carlos Díaz de Mendoza as Tono Cienfuegos  
 José Calle as El gobernador 
 Rafael Calvo as El tabernero

References

Bibliography
 Bentley, Bernard. A Companion to Spanish Cinema. Boydell & Brewer 2008. 
 Hortelano, Lorenzo J. Torres. Directory of World Cinema: Spain.  Intellect Books, 2011.

External links

1935 films
Spanish musical comedy films
1935 musical comedy films
1930s Spanish-language films
Films directed by Benito Perojo
Films set in Spain
Spanish black-and-white films